Leesville is an unincorporated community in Jefferson Township, Crawford County, Ohio, in the United States.

History
Leesville was laid out in 1829 by Robert Lee, Sr., and named for him.

References

Unincorporated communities in Crawford County, Ohio
Unincorporated communities in Ohio